Warsaw 44 is a 2014 Polish war film, originally titled Miasto 44 (City 44). The film depicts the Warsaw Uprising in 1944 during the German occupation of Poland.

Plot 
In the summer of 1944, the Red Army advances from the east in the direction of Warsaw. For that reason, the Polish underground Home Army launches a revolt against the German occupying force. Underground fighter Stefan joins the armed uprising. He loves nurse Ala, but also has feelings for an underground fighter named Kama. A story of love and friendship unveils during the bloody and brutal reality of the 1944 Warsaw Uprising as the uprising is crushed, with heavy casualties and most of the city destroyed.

Stefan is an activist who assists the AK, but is not quite a member. As he hides his gun at work, he attempts to hide it from a SS officer, Johan Krauss, who slaps around his face with his whip. Together with his friends, he goes out to the countryside where he meets Ala, who has swum out to an island in a lake that she refuses to leave. Stefan is attracted to Ala and vice versa. Stefan joins the AK, which upsets his mother. Ala comes from a wealthy szlachta (noble) family and over their opposition decides to go to Warsaw to join Operation Tempest. When the Warsaw Uprising begins on 1 August 1944, Stefan joins in the fighting, Ala works as a nurse and Kama as a messenger. Stefan and Ala declare their love for each other. After he sees his mother and little brother executed by the SS, Stefan becomes catatonic and Ala has to save him numerous times as Warsaw is destroyed while the dreaded Kaminski Brigade and the equally feared Dirlewanger Brigade are unleashed against the people of Warsaw.

As their friends are steadily killed one after another, Stefan recovers from his catatonic shock after Ala passionately kisses him. Stefan saves the live of Krauss who was wounded and captured by the AK.   Stefan joins the last surviving AK fighters, determined to fight onto the end. Kama is killed while Krauss spares Stefan. Ala goes looking for Stefan despite the danger.  With Warsaw almost completely destroyed, both Stefan and Ala swim out to an island in the Vistula river and embrace one another-their final fates are not revealed. The last shot is of Warsaw in flames and in ruins at night which transforms into a shot of modern Warsaw at day while the narrator notes that almost no-one was living in Warsaw after the uprising.

Cast 
 Józef Pawłowski – Stefan Zawadzki
 Zofia Wichłacz – Biedronka (Alicja Saska)
 Anna Próchniak – Kama (Kamila Jedrusik)
  – Beksa
 Maurycy Popiel – Góral
 Filip Gurłacz – Rogal
 Tomasz Schuchardt – Kobra
 Sebastian Fabijański – Sagan

Background 
The film was released on the 70th anniversary of the Warsaw Uprising in Polish cinemas. It received diverse Polish film awards. Its first TV broadcast in Germany was on 2 August 2015 by ZDF.

Production
Jan Komasa, who wrote and directed the film stated "We want to show the Warsaw Uprising to the world" and to "give the Warsaw Uprising its deserved place in world-wide consciousness". Parts of the film were shot on location in Warsaw while many of the battle scenes were shot in an abandoned factory in Łódź. The rest of the battle scenes were shot in Walim and Świebodzice in Lower Silesia. As the city of Warsaw was almost destroyed during the uprising, many of the scenes required computer-generated imagery to recreate the Warsaw of old.

Links 
 
 ZDF-Presseportal

References 

2014 films
2014 war drama films
Polish war drama films
Polish World War II films
Films set in 1944
Films set in Warsaw
Films about Polish resistance during World War II
Warsaw Uprising
World War II films based on actual events